James Harris (born 26 August 1987) is a Welsh rugby union player. He was educated at Eltham College and the University of Oxford, where he played on the winning university team in the 2012 and 2013 Varsity Matches. In the 2013 match he was substituted after suffering a dislocated hip in the first half, which later required surgery.

Harris plays in the position of flanker. He was selected for the Wales national rugby sevens team squad in 2007 and has also represented Wales Under-20s. He played for Bedwas RFC, before joining Newport Gwent Dragons regional team on 30 September 2006. He was released by Newport Gwent Dragons in August 2010 and joined the Blackheath Rugby Club. In August 2011 he joined London Wasps, where he played until 2012.

References

1987 births
Living people
Wasps RFC players
Dragons RFC players
People educated at Eltham College
Plymouth Albion R.F.C. players
Welsh rugby union players